Ntombiyelanga Ndlovu is a Zimbabwean former footballer who played as a forward. She has been a member of the Zimbabwe women's national team.

Club career
Ndlovu has played for New Orleans in Zimbabwe.

International career
Ndlovu capped for Zimbabwe at senior level during the 2008 African Women's Championship qualification.

References

Living people
Zimbabwean women's footballers
Women's association football forwards
Zimbabwe women's international footballers
Year of birth missing (living people)